Ísbjarnarblús (English: "Polar Bear Blues") was the debut solo record released by Icelandic songwriter Bubbi Morthens.

The album was released on June 17, 1980 in co-operation with Bókaútgáfan Iðunn.  Within three days, the record went to second place on DV best-sellers list and it was on Iceland's top 10 best-selling records list for 5 weeks.

Track listing
 "Ísbjarnarblús"
 "Hrognin eru að koma"
 "MB Rosinn"
 "Grettir og Glámur"
 "Jón Pönkari"
 "Hollywood"
 "Agnes og Friðrik"
 "Hve þungt er yfir bænum"
 "Þorskacharleston"
 "Færeyjablús"
 "Mr. Dylan"
 "Masi"
 "Stál og hnífur"

External links
 Picture of the record sleeve

1980 albums
Bubbi Morthens albums